Lungotevere De' Cenci is the stretch of Lungotevere that connects Ponte Garibaldi to the Ponte Fabricio, in Rome, in the rioni Sant'Angelo and Regola.

It is located between the Capitoline hill and the Tiber Island; among its main landmarks, there are the modern Synagogue of Rome, to which is attached the museum of the Jewish community of Rome; at the corner of Via del Tempio lies the Villino Astengo, built in 1914 in Art Nouveau style. Its designer was Ezio Garroni, the villino's decorations are by Giuseppe Zina.

Notes

Bibliography 

De'Cenci
Streets in Rome R. XI Sant'Angelo
Streets in Rome R. VII Regola